Kim Wilkins (born 22 December 1966) is an Australian writer of popular fiction based in Brisbane, Queensland. She is the author of more than twenty-five mass-market novels, including her debut horror novel, The Infernal (1997), which won Aurealis Awards for both horror and fantasy. She has been published in twenty languages. She also writes general women's fiction as Kimberley Freeman.

Kim Wilkins was educated at the University of Queensland. She has a first class honours degree in literature (1998), an MA (2000) and a PhD (2006). She was awarded the University Medal for academic achievement in 1998 and is currently an Associate Professor there in writing and publishing studies.

Early life
Wilkins was born in London and grew up in Redcliffe, Queensland.

Bibliography

Adult fiction
 The Infernal (1997)
 Grimoire (1999)
 The Resurrectionists (2000)
 Angel of Ruin (2001) ( Fallen Angel)
 The Autumn Castle (2003)
 Giants of the Frost (2004)
 Rosa and the Veil of Gold (2005) (a.k.a. The Veil of Gold)
 Duet (2007), as Kimberley Freeman
 Gold Dust (2008), as Kimberley Freeman
 Wildflower Hill (2010), as Kimberley Freeman
 Lighthouse Bay (2013), as Kimberley Freeman
 Ember Island (2013), as Kimberley Freeman
 The Year of Ancient Ghosts (2013)
 Evergreen Falls (2014), as Kimberley Freeman
 Daughters of the Storm (2014)
 Sisters of the Fire (2016)
 Odin's Girl (2017)
 Stars Across the Ocean (2017), as Kimberley Freeman
 The Silver Well (2017), with Kate Forsyth
 Daughters of the Storm (6 March 2018)

Young-adult fiction

 Bloodlace (2001)
 Fireheart (2002)
 Moonstorm (2003)
 Witchsong (2005)
 Nightshade
 The Pearl Hunters (2008) (a.k.a. Unclaimed Heart)

Children's fiction

 Space Boogers (2004)
 Ghost Ship (2006)
 Tide Stealers (2006)
 Sorcerer of the Waves (2006)
 The Star Queen (2006)

Short fiction

 The House at Candle Grove (2000) 
 Vanity’s Bewitchment (2000) in Difficult Love
 The Death of Pamela (2000) 
 Dreamless (2008)
 The Forest (2009)
 Crown of Rowan (2010) 
 In Horned Wood (2016)

References

Citations

Bibliography

External links

About Kimberley at Kimberley Freeman - Official Website and Journal
Kimberly Freeman Author's page at Simon & Schuster

1970 births
Living people
20th-century Australian novelists
21st-century Australian novelists
Australian fantasy writers
Australian horror writers
Australian women short story writers
Australian women novelists
Writers from London
People from Brisbane
20th-century Australian women writers
21st-century Australian women writers
Women science fiction and fantasy writers
20th-century Australian short story writers
21st-century Australian short story writers
University of Queensland alumni